Siparia is a town in southern Trinidad, in Trinidad and Tobago, south of San Fernando, southwest of Penal and Debe and southeast of Fyzabad. Also called "The Sand City", it was originally a non-Mission Amerindian settlement. Siparia grew to be the administrative centre for Saint Patrick County, and later the Siparia Regional Corporation. Today it is a commercial centre and market town serving the surrounding agricultural areas and oil fields. Siparia is also the seat of the Siparia Regional Corporation.

La Divina Pastora (Siparia Mai)
The festival occurs each year on the saint's day of La Divina Pastora, a few weeks after Easter. The same statue, a Black Virgin, is venerated by Hindus during a separate festival, held on Good Friday and Maundy Thursday. The Hindu celebration is often referred to the "Siparia Fete". She is La Divina Pastora, the Divine Shepherdess, a manifestation of the Virgin Mary, to Catholics, and Siparia Mai (Mother of Siparia) to Hindus. Sometimes Sipari Mai is associated with a particular Hindu goddess, such as Kali, and sometimes she is a goddess in her own right. These two religious groups are most commonly associated with her, but persons of many other religions, including Jehovah's Witnesses, Anglians, other Christian denominations, Spiritual Baptist,  Rastafarians, Orishas, Buddhist, Baháʼís, Muslims, the indigenous Warao people have been known to worship the popular saint. The early Chinese settlers who were Buddhist and of the Chinese folk religion saw her as their goddess Guanyin. There has even been some Muslims who regard the site as holy and offer prayers towards Mecca, but they do not worship the statue as it is against the teachings of Islam.

The origin of the statue is unknown, but seems to have been in the Siparia area since the 18th century.

Notable people from Siparia 
 Giselle Salandy, boxer
 Ian Morris, track and field athlete
 Kamla Persad-Bissessar, politician
 Daisy Voisin, Parang Queen
 Njisane Phillip, cyclist

References

Populated places in Trinidad and Tobago